Saeed Roustaee (Persian: سعید روستایی, born August 14, 1989), also spelled Saeed Roustayi, is an Iranian director, screenwriter and producer. He has won the Crystal Simorgh for Best Director, Best Screenplay and Best First Director at the 34th Fajr Film Festival for his feature directorial debut in drama film Life and a Day (2016). In 2022, his second film, Just 6.5 (2019), was nominated for the César Award for Best Foreign Film. In April 2022, his third film, Leila's Brothers (2022), was selected to compete for the Palme d'Or at the 2022 Cannes Film Festival.

Early life 
He graduated from Soore University with a Bachelor of Film and Television in Directing.

Career 
Life and a Day is his first major cinematic work. At the Fajr International Film Festival, Roustayi won 2 Crystal Simorghs for best directing and best screenplay. He received the 2016 Reflet d'Or for Best Feature at the Geneva International Film Festival Tous Ecrans.

His works primarily focus on issues of social injustice, as well as his portrayals of women in Iranian society.

His third feature film Leila's Brothers competed in the 2022 Cannes Film Festival where it won the FIPRESCI Prize for films screened in the main competition section.

Filmography

Feature films

Short films

Awards and nominations

References

External links 
 
 

Soore University alumni
Iranian film directors
Iranian screenwriters
Living people
1989 births
Crystal Simorgh for Best Director winners
Crystal Simorgh for Best Screenplay winners